The 2018 Las Vegas Lights FC season was the club's inaugural season, and their first season in the United Soccer League, the second division of American soccer. The Lights played their home matches at Cashman Field, north of Downtown Las Vegas.

The Lights' first season began on March 17 against fellow expansion side Fresno FC at Chukchansi Park with a 3–2 victory.

Background 
In April 2017, Brett Lashbrook, former COO of Orlando City SC, received preliminary approval for a USL expansion franchise in Las Vegas  and thus began negotiations with Las Vegas city officials over a lease agreement to allow his franchise to play their home games at Cashman Field north of Downtown Las Vegas.  After three months of negotiations, the Las Vegas City Council unanimously approved a 15-year lease between Lashbrook and the city to play their home games at Cashman Field that was to begin on January 1, 2018.  As part of the lease, the Las Vegas 51s minor league baseball club would remain the venue's primary tenant and would receive priority on scheduling, however, if the 51s were to move from Cashman Field, the city and Lashbrook would look to convert Cashman Field into a modern soccer specific stadium as part of a redevelopment of the area.

In August 2017, Lashbrook, alongside Nevada governor Brian Sandoval, Las Vegas mayor Carolyn Goodman, and USL officials, officially announced Las Vegas as the 33rd member of the USL at a fan festival at Zappos headquarters in downtown Las Vegas.  During the presentation, Lashbrook announced six potential names (Viva Vegas, Las Vegas Silver, Las Vegas FC, Las Vegas Lights, Las Vegas Action, and Club Vegas) for the franchise, with the official name for the club being chosen through a fan vote.  Shortly after midnight on August 29, 2017, Las Vegas Lights FC, a combination of the two most popular names during the fan vote (Las Vegas Lights and Las Vegas FC), was announced as the team's official name during a presentation at the Fremont Street Experience.  Following the announcement, Lights officials asked the public to submit designs, ideas, and colors to help the team create its inaugural logo.  On October 30, 2017, the Lights released their inaugural crest which resembled the outline of the famous Welcome to Fabulous Las Vegas sign – rotated 90 degrees and included the official team colors of blue, yellow, and pink.  The colors, which were originally used on the placeholder logo presented when the team was first announced, were adopted officially after many of the fan submissions for logos incorporated the three colors.

On November 13, 2017, Fútbol Picante analyst José Luis Sánchez Solá was announced as the club's first head coach.  El Chelís, as he was commonly referred, had managed numerous clubs in the first and second divisions of Mexico and the United States, including stints with Puebla F.C., Estudiantes Tecos, and Chivas USA, prior to taking over the position with Lights FC.  In December 2017, the club expanded its partnership with Zappos.com by announcing a three-year deal for the online retailer to be the club's jersey sponsor and announced BLK as the club's jersey supplier in a multi-year deal in January 2018.

Summary

Preseason
On November 27, 2017, Lights FC announced three preseason friendlies against MLS sides at Cashman Field, as part of their preparations for their first campaign in the USL.  The matches were to be on February 10 against the Montreal Impact, February 17 against the Vancouver Whitecaps FC, and February 24 against D.C. United.

In their first preseason friendly, Lights FC fell to Montreal 2–0 in front of a sell-out crowd of 10,387, after a goal from Impact forward Michael Salazar and an own goal by Lights FC defender Joel Huiqui in a matter of three minutes in the second half.  Lights FC would fare better in their second preseason game, although they would still lose to Vancouver Whitecaps FC 3–2, with Lights FC scoring their first goals of the year through a brace from midfielder Juan José Calderón.  Seven days later, in their last home fixture of the preseason, Lights FC would see another good offensive effort with a goal from defender Miguel Garduño and another goal from Calderón, his third of the postseason; however, Lights FC would fall for the third time during the preseason, losing 4–2 to DC United.  Lights FC would get their first result in their final preseason game, after the club drew 1–1 away to Orange County FC through a 77th-minute goal from forward Anuar Kanan.

March–May 
Just prior to Lights FC's season opener, the club announced that head coach Chelís had been promoted to Technical Director for the club, with his son Isidro Sánchez Macip, who had been an assistant for Lights FC under his father, promoted to head coach.  Lights FC began the 2018 USL season on March 17 with an away fixture against Fresno FC, which Lights FC won 3–2.  Las Vegas native Matt Thomas opened the scoring within two minutes of the kick-off, while midfielder Alex Mendoza and defender Joel Huiqui added goals within seven minutes of each other in the second half.  Despite late goals by Fresno forwards Jemal Johnson and Renato Bustamante, Lights FC was able to hold on for the first victory in club history.  Thomas' performance against Fresno FC would lead him to being named to the USL Team of the Week for the first week of the season.  The following week, Lights FC would host in-state rival Reno 1868 FC in the first match of the Silver State Cup, ending in a 1–1 draw.  Mendoza would open the scoring in the 27th minute with a shot from outside of the box following a failed clearance, but was answered within a minute by Reno forward and UNLV alum Danny Musovski, who slotted home a rebound.  Reno would be down to 10-men, following a second yellow card to Musovski lead to his dismissal in the 72nd minute, despite mounting pressure by Lights FC, including a fingertip save by goalkeeper JT Marcinkowski from a header from midfielder Juan Carlos García in the 95th minute, to preserve the draw.

On March 31, Lights FC completed their first come from behind victory with a 2–1 home victory against defending Western Conference champions Swope Park Rangers.  Swope Park would open the scoring with an 18th-minute goal from midfielder Rodrigo Saravia.  Lights FC midfielder Carlos Alvarez would tie the match with a strike in the 53rd minute and a misplaced headed back pass from Swope Park defender Colton Storm helped Lights FC secure their first home victory of the season.  Lights FC defender Joel Huqui's performance against Swope Park, which included three interceptions and seven clearances, led to his selection to the USL Team of the Week and the club's performance in the month of March led to head coach Isidro Sánchez Macip, led to his selection as the USL's Coach of the Month for March.  Following a bye week, Lights FC returned to action on April 14, drawing 1–1 with Sacramento Republic FC at Cashman Field.  Defender Joel Huiqui would open the scoring two minutes into the match, but Sacramento forward Christian Eissele equalized before the hour mark and Lights FC extended their undefeated streak to four matches.

Following another bye week, Lights FC suffered their first loss of the season, dropping a 3–1 decision at home to San Antonio FC.  San Antonio received first half goals from forward Éver Guzmán and midfielder José Escalante in the 17th and 33rd minute respectively.  San Antonio would add a third when midfielder Rafael Castillo converted a penalty in the 51st minute and, despite Carlos Alvarez' 75th-minute goal, a red card to defender Christian Torres limited Lights FC's chances of closing the gap with San Antonio.  Three days later, Lights FC would participate in their first road game since the season opener when they traveled to play Western Conference leader Real Monarchs SLC.  Despite playing with 10 men for over 70 minutes, after defender Marcelo Alatorre was sent off for a dangerous foul in the 18th minute, Lights FC was able to produce numerous scoring chances, including an 84th-minute strike by midfielder Daigo Kobayashi that crashed off of the post.  Lights FC were able to hold of the Conference leaders and ended with a 0–0 draw, the first shutout for Lights FC goalkeeper Ricardo Ferriño.

Lamar Hunt U.S. Open Cup 

Lights FC entered the 2018 Lamar Hunt U.S. Open Cup in the second round, defeating Premier Development League side FC Tucson, 4–2 on May 16.  The match, which was played at Peter Johann Memorial Soccer Field on UNLV's campus, was the first that Lights FC hosted away from Cashman Field, as the baseball field would not be converted to a soccer pitch in time following a Las Vegas 51s home stand.  Lights FC would jump out to an early lead as midfielder Carlos Alvarez and defender Alatorre scored within the first ten minutes of the match.  Forward Jason Romero would put FC Tucson on the board with a goal in the 38th minute and three minutes after the restart, midfielder Adrian Valenzuela tied the score at 2–2.  Lights forward Sammy Ochoa would net his first two goals of the year with goals in the 56th and 65th minute to help Lights FC advance to the third round.

In the third round of the tournament, Lights FC were knocked out by PDL side FC Golden State Force in an away fixture, 2–1, on May 23.  After a stalemate in the first half, FC Golden State Force's Allisson Faramilio opened the scoring a quarter of an hour from full time with a shot from outside of the box.  Although defender Joel Huiqui would net the equalizer with a header off of a corner kick in the 81st minute, Faramilio would secure the victory and advancement in the competition for FC Golden State after converting a penalty shot in stoppage time.

June–August 
On June 2, Lights FC won their first regular season game since March 31, defeating Colorado Springs Switchbacks FC, 4–1.  Carlos Alvarez opened the scoring with a strike in the 24th minute, while midfielder Freddy Adu and forward Sammy Ochoa scored their first league goals of the season with strikes in the 47th and 58th minute, respectively.  Colorado Springs defender Josh Suggs would pull a goal back for Switchbacks FC, but midfielder Matt Thomas would secure the 3 points for Lights FC with a goal in stoppage time to snap the club's seven match winless streak.  After an 11-day layoff, Lights FC made their first visit to regional rival Phoenix Rising FC, losing 4–0 to the hosts.  Phoenix would receive goals from defender Joe Farrell and forward Solomon Asante, as well as a brace from forward Jason Johnson to send Lights FC to their fourth league loss in five matches.  Following the match against Phoenix, an altercation took place between a fan and Technical Director Chelís.  The altercation began when the fan yelled something profane at Chelís and he responded by going up to the fan, placing a hand on the fan, and asking him to repeat what he said.  Two days after the incident, the USL suspended Chelís for eight games.

Lights FC would return to action three days later hosting Seattle Sounders FC 2, seeing several changes in the lineup including goalkeeper and Las Vegas native Angel Alvarez' debut for the club.  Lights FC would ride an offensive outburst in the first half with a brace from Sammy Ochoa and a third goal from Joel Huiqui to take a 3–1 lead into halftime and would add a fourth with a goal from newly acquired midfielder Zach Mathers, as Lights FC won their second straight home match 4–1.  Lights FC's next match would be away to Swope Park Rangers, losing to the hosts 3–2.  Lights FC would receive goals from midfielder Daigo Kobayashi and forward Sammy Ochoa and had a chance to get an equalizer from a penalty late into stoppage time, but failed to convert when midfielder Carlos Alvarez passed the spot kick to a charging Ochoa in a designed trick play instead of shooting the penalty.  Ochoa's shot would ring off the post with Rangers able to clear the ball for the final whistle.  Lights FC would continue their Midwestern swing with a match away to Tulsa Roughnecks FC, drawing 2–2 to extend their road winless streak to six matches.  Tulsa would score first after midfielder Joaquin Rivas converted a penalty minutes into the match, while Lights FC would receive goals from midfielders Raúl Mendiola and Daigo Kobayashi.  Lights FC had a chance to extend the lead, but forward Sammy Ochoa launched a penalty kick over the crossbar in the 62nd minute and defender Josh Morton would score the equalizer for the hosts a minute after Ochoa's miss.

Lights FC would open their first match of the month of July at home against Saint Louis FC.  Lights FC were able to extend their home winning streak to three matches through a goal from midfielder Raúl Mendiola shortly into the second half, his second consecutive match with a goal, and goalkeeper Ricardo Ferriño recorded his second shutout of the season, as Lights FC won 1–0.  After a one assist, four tackle, and two interception performance against Saint Louis FC, on loan defender Nico Samayoa would be named to the USL Team of the Week for Week 17.  Lights FC would begin a four match road trip with a match against OKC Energy FC on July 11.  Despite the first hat trick in club history coming from Mendiola and another goal from midfielder Carlos Alvarez, Lights FC would extend their road winless streak to seven matches, as the fell to Energy FC 6–4.  Lights FC's struggles would continue on the road, dropping a 2–0 result away to Rio Grande Valley FC Toros.  Goals from Toros' defender Conor Donovan and forward Jesús Enríquez extended Lights FC's road winless streak to eight matches.  Eight days later, Lights FC would travel to Portland to take on Timbers 2.  After a goalless first half, forward Sammy Ochoa netted his fifth goal of the season in 53rd minute.  Timbers 2 midfielder Jack Barmby was able to level the match with a goal in 63rd minute, however, forward Omar Salgado would score his first goal of the season in the 74th minute, securing Lights FC's first road victory since March 17, ending an eight match road winless streak.  Lights FC would end their longest road trip on July 26 against Seattle Sounders FC 2.  The Lights would fall behind early to Sounders 2 after midfielder Antonee Burke-Gilroy scored in the second minute of the game and were hampered more so after defender Marcelo Alatorre received his second yellow of the match in the 45th minute and midfielder Carlos Alvarez received a straight red card two minutes later, leaving Lights FC down to 9 men with a full half to play.  Sounders 2 would capitalize on their two-man advantage, getting a penalty kick goal from forward David Estrada and a goal from former UNLV forward Lamar Neagle to lead to a 3–0 loss for Lights FC.

Lights FC would return home to Cashman Field on August 4 against Rio Grande Valley FC Toros on August 4.  Lights FC were led by goalkeeper Ricardo Ferriño has he stopped all seven shots from RGV FC on way to his third shutout of the season.  Defender Joel Huiqui netted the winner for Lights FC in the 82nd minute, as Lights FC extended their home winning streak to four matches with a 1–0 victory.  Ferriño's seven saves led to him being named to the USL Team of the Week for Week 21.

Club

Competitions

Preseason

United Soccer League

Table

Results by round

Results

Lamar Hunt U.S. Open Cup

Statistics

Appearances 
Source:

Numbers in parentheses denote appearances as substitute.
Players listed with no appearances have been in the matchday squad, but only as unused substitutes.
Discipline includes league, playoffs, and Open Cup play.
Key to positions: GK – Goalkeeper; DF – Defender; MF – Midfielder; FW – Forward

Top scorers 
The list is sorted by shirt number when total goals are equal.

Clean sheets 
The list is sorted by shirt number when total appearances are equal.

Transfers 
Players transferred in

Players loaned in

Players transferred out

Players loaned out

Players released

Awards

Player

Coach

See also 
 2018 USL season
 2018 in American soccer

References 

Las Vegas Lights FC seasons
Las Vegas Lights
Las Vegas Lights
Las Vegas Lights